Laura Cunningham Wilson (born October 13, 1939) is an American photographer.  She has completed five books of photography and text: Watt Matthews of Lambshead (1989), Hutterites of Montana (2000), Avedon at Work: In the American West (2003), Grit and Glory: Six-Man Football (2003), and That Day: Pictures in the American West (2015). She is the mother of actors Owen Wilson, Andrew Wilson, and Luke Wilson.

Life and career
Wilson was born Laura Cunningham and raised in Norwell, Massachusetts, the daughter of Rosemary Cunningham (née White) and Edward J. Cunningham. She majored in art at Connecticut College, graduating in 1961. She married Robert Wilson in 1963, and the couple moved to Dallas, Texas, in 1965.

Wilson's attraction to photographs started as a young girl when she became interested in family photographs. Some of her earliest photographs are of her three young sons: "I had majored in painting in college. But with three little boys underfoot, I didn't have time to lift a paintbrush. Then a friend gave me a camera. I realized at once that the boys were perfect subjects." Wilson's son Owen credits his and his brothers' comfort in front of a camera to being frequently photographed by their mother.

Wilson's professional career was launched in 1979 when Richard Avedon hired her to assist with his exhibition and book In the American West, which was commissioned by the Amon Carter Museum. Wilson traveled with Avedon for six years, helping him find subjects to photograph. Wilson also wrote the text for In the American West. Wilson's work with Avedon helped her become deeply familiar with the West and provided inspiration for her later projects. Wilson's photographs acknowledge the spectrum of cultures that occupy the West.

During the period she worked with Avedon, Wilson arrived at her interest in photographing people outside of mainstream America. "I became interested in men and women who are trying to live an idealized life against the odds." In a January 2018 interview she described her artistic attraction to isolated groups of people, saying, "I am drawn to people who live in an enclosed world — those people who live in isolated communities, whether by circumstance or accomplishment; I was curious about these groups and wanted to know more... my wish, as Eudora Welty wrote, 'would be not to point the finger in judgement but to part a curtain, that invisible shadow that falls between people.'"

Wilson frequently refers to photography's ability to mitigate loss and the fleeting nature of life.

Wilson has lectured on photography at Harvard University, the International Center of Photography in New York City, the San Francisco Museum of Modern Art and the University of Texas at Austin.

She is a member of the Texas Institute of Letters and the Philosophical Society of Texas. She serves on the board of the William P. Clements Center for Southwest Studies at Southern Methodist University. In 2019, she was inducted into the National Cowgirl Museum and Hall of Fame.

Books

Wilson has completed five books of photography and text:

Watt Matthews of Lambshead (1989) is a photographic essay about one of the last Texas cattlemen. Matthews lived his entire life on the famous Lambshead Ranch, located west of Fort Worth. In Matthews' obituary, The New York Times wrote that the book has become "a classic of Texas history." The book was described by Texas State Historical Association Director Ron Tyler as "an unusual combination of subject and author-artist."

Hutterites of Montana (2000) documents the Hutterite communities of the American West. Wilson's interest in the Hutterites began during her work with Avedon: "Still vivid in my mind is my first glimpse of the Hutterites. I was working for Richard Avedon and we were driving in Montana at dusk. There was a lovely pink sunset. We saw in the distance an open meadow of wheat, figures walking. The girls were in long, colorful dresses, like Christian LaCroix, the boys in white shirts and black pants." Hutterite communities generally do not allow photography, but Wilson visited Montana Hutterite communities many times and eventually received permission to take photos.

Avedon at Work: In the American West (2003) is a portrait of photographer Richard Avedon that shows Avedon's creative process, working methods, and range of subjects as he worked to complete In the American West. Wilson documented Avedon's work throughout the six years they spent working on the project, and the book describes their work on the project.

Grit and Glory: Six-Man Football (2003) documents six-man football and its culture in small Texas towns.

That Day: Pictures in the American West (2015) includes photographs in the American West accompanied by Wilson's observations from the time each photograph was taken. Larry McMurtry wrote, "Laura Wilson has an ever-searching eye for the bleak beauty of the West — and for its bleak reality too. That Day is a remarkable book." Andrew R. Graybill, Director of the William P. Clements Center for Southwest Studies, noted that the book "combines her talents for capturing the West's enduring and romantic myths, from legendary cattle ranches to dramatic panoramic vistas, as well as its bleak realities, whether undocumented migrants crossing the Rio Grande or life on the Pine Ridge Indian Reservation."

Personal life
Wilson lives in Dallas, Texas, and is the mother of actors Andrew, Owen, and Luke, and grandparent to six grandchildren through Andrew and Owen. She was married to TV Station executive Robert A. Wilson, until his death from Alzheimer's disease on May 5, 2017.

Publications
Watt Matthews of Lambshead. Texas State Historical Association, 1989. .
 Hutterites of Montana. Yale University Press, 2000. .
 Avedon at Work: In the American West. University of Texas Press, 2003. .
 Grit and Glory: Six-Man Football. Bright Sky Press, 2003. .
Our Architecture: Arts & Humanities DFW/2012.  Dallas, Tex.: Dallas Architecture Forum, 2012
 That Day: Pictures in the American West. Yale University Press, 2015. .

Exhibitions
Watt Matthews of Lambshead, Irving Arts Center, 1994
Photographs from Avedon at Work, Amon Carter Museum of American Art, Fort Worth, Texas, September 2005
 Photographs from Grit & Glory, Meadows Museum, Southern Methodist University, 2011
 That Day: Laura Wilson, Amon Carter Museum of American Art, September 2015 – February 2016
 That Day: Laura Wilson, Booth Western Art Museum, January 2018 – April 2018
Laura Wilson: Looking West, National Cowgirl Museum and Hall of Fame, October 3, 2019 – March 15, 2020

References

External links
 
 "Amon Carter Museum Presents Laura Wilson: Avedon at Work", Amon Carter Museum, Fort Worth, Texas

1939 births
American women photographers
Artists from Massachusetts
Artists from Sacramento, California
Connecticut College alumni
Living people
People from Fort Worth, Texas
American portrait photographers
Southern Methodist University faculty
American women academics
21st-century American women